Back to Back is the second album by American jazz fusion group, the Brecker Brothers. It was released by Arista Records in 1976.

AllMusic gave the album three stars.

Track listing
 "Keep it Steady (Brecker Bump)" (Randy Brecker, Steve Khan, David Sanborn, Luther Vandross) – 6:24
 "If You Wanna Boogie...Forget It" (Don Grolnick, Steve Khan, Will Lee) – 3:58
 "Lovely Lady" (Randy Brecker, Allee Willis, Charlotte Crossley) – 6:17
 "Night Flight" (Michael Brecker) – 6:17
 "Slick Stuff" (Randy Brecker) – 4:48
 "Dig a Little Deeper" (Don Grolnick, Will Lee, Allee Willis, David Lasley) – 4:00
 "Grease Piece" (Michael Brecker, Randy Brecker, Steve Khan, David Sanborn) – 5:47
 "What Can a Miracle Do" (Don Grolnick, Luther Vandross) – 4:16
 "I Love Wastin' Time With You" (Michael Brecker, Allee Willis, Charlotte Crossley) – 6:31

Personnel 

The Brecker Brothers
  Michael Brecker – tenor saxophone, flute
 Randy Brecker – trumpet, electric trumpet, flugelhorn

Other Musicians
 Don Grolnick – keyboards
 Dave Wittman – synthesizer programming
 Steve Khan – guitars
 Will Lee – electric bass, lead vocals, backing vocals 
 Chris Parker – drums (1, 2, 3, 5-8)
 Steve Gadd – drums (4, 9)
 Ralph MacDonald – percussion (1, 2, 3, 5-9)
 Sammy Figueroa – percussion (4)
 Rafael Cruz – percussion (4)
 David Friedman – marimba (6)
 David Sanborn – alto saxophone
 Lew Del Gatto – baritone saxophone (2)
 Luther Vandross – backing vocals, BGV arrangements
 Robin Clark – backing vocals
 Diane Sumler – backing vocals
 Patti Austin – backing vocals (9)
 Allee Willis – backing vocals (9)

Production
 Steve Backer – executive producer
 The Brecker Brothers – producers
 Jimmy Douglass – engineer
 Jerry Solomon – assistant engineer 
 Nancy Greenberg – art direction, design
 Robert L. Heimall – art direction, design
 Benno Friedman – photography
 Anthony Barone – management

References

1976 albums
Brecker Brothers albums
Arista Records albums